Lancelot-Théodore, Comte de Turpin de Crissé (9 July 1782, in Paris – 15 May 1859, in Paris) was a French writer and painter. His most familiar works are landscapes with structures, usually set in Italy.

Biography 
His father was Colonel Henri Roland Lancelot Turpin de Crissé, an amateur painter of some note. The family was financially ruined by the Revolution and had to flee Paris, but he was able to finish his studies in Switzerland and Italy, thanks to the patronage of Marie-Gabriel-Florent-Auguste de Choiseul-Gouffier.  Upon his return to France in 1809, he exhibited at the Salon. He was then granted the protection of the Imperial Family and became Chamberlain to the former Empress Josephine after her divorce. In 1810, he accompanied her on a trip to Switzerland and Savoy, returning with a large album of drawings.

In 1813, he married into a noble family and received a large inheritance from a cousin. Three years later, he became a member of the Académie des Beaux-Arts. He was then appointed to the "Board of Royal Museums" (1824) and Inspector-General for the "Département des Beaux-Arts" (1825). That same year, he was awarded the Légion d'honneur. He was named an honorary member of the Maison du Roi in 1829. During this period he made three lengthy trips to Italy; the last on the occasion of his appointment to the Accademia di Belle Arti di Venezia.

Despite his association with the Bonapartes, he was a staunch Legitimist, resigning all of his offices following the advent of the July Monarchy in 1830 and returning to private life. He continued to exhibit, however, including a show at the Royal Academy of Arts in 1832. Three years later, he published Souvenirs du vieux Paris, exemples d'architecture de temps et de styles divers. He continued to advocate for the Bourbons until his death.

He was also known as an avid art collector and promoted many contemporary artists through purchases of their works. Among them were Blondel, Granet and Ingres. His collection included antiquities as well, which he donated to the Musée des Beaux-Arts d'Angers. From December 2006 to April 2007, the museum presented a major retrospective of his works, in an effort to make his name known again.

References

Further reading
 Patrick Le Nouëne, Caroline Chaine: Lancelot-Théodore Turpin de Crissé: peintre et collectionneur, Paris, 1782-1859, Musée des beaux-arts, Bibliothèque Marmottan, Somogy (2006)

External links

Arcadja Auctions: More works by Turpin de Crissé.
La Tribune de l'Art: Exhibition at Angers, 2006-2007.

1782 births
1859 deaths
19th-century French painters
French male painters
French landscape painters
Recipients of the Legion of Honour
Legitimists
French male writers
19th-century French writers
Painters from Paris
Writers from Paris
19th-century French male writers
19th-century French male artists